The Party Album, also known as The Party LP is a 1978 live blues recording by Alexis Korner.  The double album features Alexis Korner and various guest musicians singing a mix of both classic blues songs as well as some of Korner's own.  The concert was a celebration of Korner's 50th birthday.

The album was originally released in 1980 and re-released in 1993.

Track listing
“Things Ain't What They Used to Be” (Mercer Ellington) – 7:23
“Captain's Tiger” (Alexis Korner) – 3:30
“Skipping” (Korner) – 3:10
“Spoonful” (Willie Dixon) – 6:40
Medley – 9:06 
“Finkles Cafe” (Korner) 
“Dooji Hooji” (Duke Ellington) 
“Whole Mess of Blues” (Doc Pomus, Mort Shuman) – 5:36
“Lining Track” (Huddie Ledbetter) – 3:15
“Robert Johnson” (Korner, J. Edwards) – 6:15
“Hey Pretty Mama” (Chris Farlowe) – 4:19
“Hi-Heel Sneakers” (Robert Higginbotham) – 9:15
“Stormy Monday Blues” (Billy Eckstein, Earl Hines) – 5:59

Personnel

Musicians
 Alexis Korner – vocals, electric guitar, acoustic guitar, cowbell/backing vocals 
 Zoot Money – electric piano, vocals, backing vocals, tambourine 
 Mel Collins – tenor saxophone, soprano saxophone 
 Dick Heckstall-Smith – tenor saxophone 
 Art Themen – tenor saxophone
 Dick Morrissey – tenor saxophone 
 John Surman – baritone saxophone, soprano saxophone 
 Mike Zwerin – trombone 
 Sappho Gillet – tambourine/backing vocals 
 Chris Farlowe – vocals, tambourine 
 Eric Clapton – electric guitar
 Colin Hodgkinson – bass guitar
 Stu Speer – drums
 Duffy Power – harmonica
 Paul Jones – harmonica 
 Neil Ford – electric guitar

Technical
 Alexis Korner – producer
 Damian Korner – assistant producer, engineer
 Andy Jackson, Pete Walsh, Gordon Vicary, Mike Robinson – assistant engineers

References

1978 live albums